Avenionia brevis is a species of small freshwater snail with a gill and an operculum, an aquatic gastropod mollusk in the family Hydrobiidae.

This species is found in eastern France.  It is known from freshwater springs, and is suspected to also live in subterranean habitats. The species is protected by law in France.

References

Avenionia
Hydrobiidae
Gastropods described in 1805
Endemic molluscs of Metropolitan France
Taxonomy articles created by Polbot